Zlatni dvori (Golden Palace) is a Croatian telenovela produced by Nova TV. It is an original story, produced in 2016, and starring Katarina Baban, Matko Knešaurek as main protagonists, Petra Kraljev and Ivan Herceg co-star, while  Ana Majhenić star as main antagonists. It is also broadcast in Bosnia-Herzegovina and Republic of Macedonia. First season airs from September 6, 2016.

Plot
Zlatni dvori is a story of romance between Ana (Katarina Baban), a village girl who takes care of horses on an estate in Slavonia, and Petar (Matko Knešaurek), a young, rich man, who is kind deep in his soul. Petar's father Vinko (Milan Štrljić), is a business partner with Nikola (Robert Kurbaša), master of estate Ana is working on, and Fedor (Marko Torjanac), father of Petar's fiancée, very spoiled rising singer Nera (Petra Kraljev).
	
Ana lives with father Antun (Darko Milas), and grandfather Joza (Duško Valentić). One day, there was a wedding in Nikola's and his sister's restaurant, and Petar was on it. Ana left the restaurant and went to see her mare, Plamenka, and Petar followed her. Ana accidentally pushed him in droppings, and he went to Joza to clean his trousers. But then, a fire broke out in the barn where Plamenka and Ana were. Luckily, Petar saved Ana. But then Nera came, and when she saw what's happening, she was very mad on Petar. Nera hates Ana from then, because she wants Petar only for herself: and what Nera wants, she will get it... Later she becomes good and helps Ana gets back to Petar and Nera falls in love with Mladen. Mladen's ex-wife Eva, played by Ana Majhenić, returns to get him back, she starts using tricks to get Mladen back for her. In meanwhile, Irena wants Vinko to sell the house, so they can get back to Zagreb. This makes problem because Petar doesn't want to leave Ana pregnant in village.

Cast

External links 
 

Croatian television series
Nova TV (Croatia) original programming